Fragapane is a surname. Notable people with the surname include:

Claudia Fragapane (born 1997), British artistic gymnast
Franco Fragapane (born 1993), Argentine footballer